John Henry Soulsby "Jack" Potts (17 September 1906 – 25 April 1987) was a British long-distance runner. He competed in the men's 10,000 metres at the 1936 Summer Olympics.

References

1906 births
1987 deaths
Athletes (track and field) at the 1934 British Empire Games
Athletes (track and field) at the 1936 Summer Olympics
British male long-distance runners
Olympic athletes of Great Britain
Place of birth missing